Rashad Jamal Taylor (born March 21, 1981) is a political consultant and former politician from Atlanta, Georgia. A Democrat, he served from 2009 to 2013 in the Georgia House of Representatives, representing the City of Atlanta from the 55th House District. He was first elected in November 2008, at 27 years old, making him the youngest serving member of the General Assembly. After re-election in 2010, he was elected Vice Chairman of the House Democratic Caucus, the fourth highest ranking leadership position in the House.  At 31, Taylor was the youngest member of the General Assembly leadership, House or Senate, Democrat or Republican.

Early life and career
Taylor was born and raised in Washington, D.C., where he attended D.C. Public Schools, graduating from Woodrow Wilson High School. Rashad was the first high school student ever selected for an internship via the Congressional Black Caucus College Internship Program; he interned in the office of Rep. John Lewis (D–Georgia) before moving to Atlanta where he attended college. He moved to Atlanta to attend Morehouse College, where as a student, he led a living wage campaign for the school's janitors and helped found Atlanta Jobs with Justice, which ended in a salary increase for janitors. Taylor also worked as a Finance Assistant for US Senator Max Cleland.

He subsequently worked as a political consultant and campaign manager, managing the campaigns of Alisha Thomas Morgan, elected to the Georgia House in 2002, and Khaatim S. El, elected to the Atlanta Board of Education in 2003. Morgan and El were the youngest members to serve in their respective legislative bodies. From 2003 - 2006, Taylor successfully managed several successful campaigns in metro Atlanta for sheriff, Superior Court, Georgia House, Georgia Senate, city council, and county commission. In 2006, Rashad became a lobbyist and legislative coordinator for Planned Parenthood of Georgia. That year, Taylor helped to protect the rights of same-sex marriages to adoption. In May 2006, Rashad Taylor was named one of ten Democratic "Rising Stars" in national politics by Campaigns and Elections Magazine. In June 2007, Taylor was appointed political director of the Democratic Party of Georgia, a position he held until joining the Legislature in January 2009.

In 2009, Rep. Taylor served as deputy campaign manager for Atlanta Mayor Kasim Reed's mayoral campaign and served on Mayor Reed's transition team. As deputy campaign manager, Taylor oversaw the political, field, and policy/communications operations of the campaign.  In 2010, Taylor managed the successful re-election campaign of Fulton County Commission Chairman John Eaves. Rep. Taylor has served on the Board of Directors of NARAL Pro-Choice Georgia, the Youth Task Force, and the Joseph Whitehead YMCA.  Taylor currently serves on the Board of Directors of The Kindezi School.  Taylor is a 2011 graduate of LEAD Atlanta.

In politics
In 2008, state representative Mable Thomas decided against seeking re-election, choosing instead to mount an unsuccessful primary challenge to John Lewis in the 5th congressional district. Her decision created an open seat in the Georgia House, which attracted two candidates, both Democrats, one of whom was Taylor. In the primary election held on July 15, 2008, Taylor earned 62.8% of the vote and won the Democratic nomination. He faced no opposition in the general election and took office on January 12, 2009.

He ran for re-election in 2010, facing a primary challenge from Mable Thomas, his predecessor in office. In the Democratic primary election held on July 20, 2010, Taylor won 56.1%, winning by a margin of 349 votes. Once again, he won the general election unopposed. His second term expired in January 2013.

During his first term, Rep. Taylor served on the Education, MARTA Oversight (MARTOC), and Ways and Means Committees. He was appointed Chairman of the MARTOC Subcommittee on Infrastructure and Maintenance. Taylor was also appointed Deputy Minority Whip by the House Democratic Leader and Whip.

After re-election in 2010, Taylor was elected Vice Chairman of the House Democratic Caucus, handily defeating three other colleagues without a run-off election.  Taylor was also appointed Chairman of the Atlanta-Fulton Legislative Delegation Subcommittee on Housing and Economic Development.  Taylor sponsored legislation for the City of Atlanta to extend its hotel/motel tax to help fund the construction of a new Georgia Dome.

Personal life
Taylor lives in the Historic West End neighborhood of Atlanta and is a member of Destiny World Church in Austell.

On May 27, 2011, Taylor came out as gay following the circulation of an e-mail that accused Taylor of being gay and of using his official position to solicit sexual relationships.  Taylor's accuser later admitted he had no proof to his allegations against Taylor.  He was one of four openly LGBT members of the Georgia General Assembly, alongside Reps. Karla Drenner (D–Avondale Estates), Simone Bell (D–Atlanta), and Keisha Waites (D–Atlanta).  Taylor was the first openly gay male to serve in the Georgia General Assembly and the second openly gay African American male state legislator in the United States.

References

External links
Legislative homepage
Campaign website

Living people
1981 births
Democratic Party members of the Georgia House of Representatives
Gay politicians
LGBT state legislators in Georgia (U.S. state)
Morehouse College alumni
African-American state legislators in Georgia (U.S. state)
LGBT African Americans
People from Washington, D.C.
People from Austell, Georgia
Woodrow Wilson High School (Washington, D.C.) alumni
21st-century American politicians
21st-century African-American politicians
20th-century African-American people